Vladimir Ivanovich Semenets (born 9 January 1950) is a retired Soviet cyclist. He won a gold medal in the 2000 m tandem sprint at the 1972 Summer Olympics, riding with Igor Tselovalnikov. In the following five years he won three silver and one bronze medals in the tandem sprint at world championships.

He was born in Russia but then moved to Ukraine and graduated from the Institute of Physical Education in Kyiv. Since 1973 he lives in Saint Petersburg and works as a cycling coach and lector at the Lesgaft University of Physical Education. He was awarded the Order of the Badge of Honour.

References

1950 births
Living people
Soviet male cyclists
Olympic cyclists of the Soviet Union
Cyclists at the 1972 Summer Olympics
Olympic gold medalists for the Soviet Union
Olympic medalists in cycling
Russian male cyclists
Medalists at the 1972 Summer Olympics
Russian track cyclists
People from Volsk
Sportspeople from Saratov Oblast